The Hanns Joachim Friedrichs Award is a German award for excellence in journalism.

It was first awarded in 1995. The award is named for the German journalist Hanns Joachim Friedrichs, who died in the year before the awards had established. The winners of the award are journalists who have achieved exceptional results in their work. The prize money is €5,000.

Winners

References

Further reading

External links 

 Official website of the Hanns Joachim Friedrichs Award

German journalism awards
German television awards